The Type 67 (aka "Type 67 silenced pistol") is a Chinese semi-automatic pistol with an integrated sound suppressor. The gun is the successor to the Type 64 silenced pistol.
Where the Type 64 had the suppressor bulging out under the barrel and in front of the trigger guard, the Type 67 features a more conventional design with the suppressor resembling a tube all around the barrel. The Type 67 is chambered for a low-powered 7.62×17mm Type 64 rimless cartridge, which makes it incompatible with the .32 ACP or 7.65×17mm rimless cartridge of the Type 64.

References

External links 
 

Silenced firearms
Semi-automatic pistols of the People's Republic of China
Cold War weapons of China
Weapons and ammunition introduced in 1968